Give Me Your Heart was a 1936 American drama film directed by Archie Mayo and starring Kay Francis, George Brent and Roland Young. It was a melodrama based on the 1934 London play Sweet Aloes, by Joyce Carey. Leading lady Kay Francis, playing the familiar role of a self-sacrificing mother, had a difficult working relationship with the director throughout the making of the film.

Synopsis
A young Englishwoman has a relationship with a married man.

Main cast
 Kay Francis as Belinda Warren
 George Brent as Jim Baker
 Roland Young as Tubbs Barrow
 Patric Knowles as Robert Melford
 Henry Stephenson as Edward - Lord Farrington
 Frieda Inescort as Rosamond Melford
 Helen Flint as Dr. Florence Cudahy  
 Halliwell Hobbes as Oliver  
 Zeffie Tilbury as Esther Warren  
 Elspeth Dudgeon as Alice Dodd

References

External links
 
 
 
 

1936 films
1936 romantic drama films
Adultery in films
American black-and-white films
American films based on plays
American romantic drama films
Films directed by Archie Mayo
Films scored by Heinz Roemheld
Films set in England
Films set in Italy
Films set in the United States
Warner Bros. films
1930s English-language films
1930s American films